Remuna (Sl. No.: 39) is a Vidhan Sabha constituency of Balasore district, Odisha.

Area of this constituency includes Remuna block and 9 GPs (Ransahi, Gudu, Padmapur, Saragan, Genguti, Sasanga, Rasalpur, Jayadevkasba and Hidigan) of Balasore block.

In 2014 election, Bharatiya Janata Party candidate Gobinda Chandra Das defeated Biju Janata Dal candidate Sudarshan Jena by a margin of 13,829 votes.

Elected Members

The elected members from this constituency are:

2019: (39): Sudhanshu Shekhar Parida (BJD)
2014: (39): Gobinda Chandra Das (BJP)
2009: (39): Sudarshan Jena (BJD)

2019 Election Result
In 2019 election, Biju Janata Dal candidate Sudhansu Sekhar Parida wins by a margin of 4118 votes.

2014 Election Result
In 2014 election, Bharatiya Janata Party candidate Gobinda Chandra Das defeated Biju Janata Dal candidate Sudarshan Jena by a margin of 13,829 votes.

Summary of results of the 2009 Election

Notes

References

Assembly constituencies of Odisha
Balasore district